Isabel Martínez, nickname La Tarabilla (4 November 1946 – 7 August 2021) was a Mexican actress and comedian. She was the sister of actress and broadcaster Patricia Martínez.

References

1946 births
2021 deaths
Mexican actresses
Place of birth missing
Place of death missing
Mexican women comedians
People from Mexico City